The 2017 IIHF World Championship Final was played at Lanxess Arena in Cologne, Germany, on 21 May 2017. Teams representing Sweden and Canada competed for the title of World Champion in ice hockey.

The first period of the game was scoreless. Sweden took the lead towards the end of the second period. Canada struck back with a power play goal early in the third period and the game ended with the score tied 1–1. An overtime period saw no further scoring, taking the final to a shootout. Sweden scored two of their three attempts, whilst Canada missed their first four, giving Sweden won the gold medal. It was Sweden's tenth title.

Road to the final
Canada had finished top of their group; of their seven games, they won six and lost one in overtime. In the knock-out stages, Canada beat Germany in the quarter-finals and Russia in the semi-finals.

Sweden finished third in their group, with five wins, one loss and one overtime loss in their seven games. They defeated Switzerland at the quarter-final stage and traditional rivals Finland in their semi-final.

Match
The first period between the two teams was goalless, with Canada managing to kill off two penalties. Sweden opened the scoring with Victor Hedman's short-handed goal shortly before the end of the second period. Canada failed to capitalize from Nicklas Bäckström's penalty for slashing and lost possession. Hedman then sent a backhanded shot past several players towards the Canadian goal, which managed to slide under Calvin Pickard. Canada responded two minutes into the third period by converting a power play. Elias Lindholm was caught high-sticking, and the resulting play allowed Ryan O'Reilly to slot in Mitch Marner's rebounded shot.

The game remained tied after overtime, meaning the game was decided via a five-round shootout. While William Nylander missed the opening penalty shot, Bäckström and Oliver Ekman-Larsson both scored their shots for Sweden. Canada failed to register a goal, with Henrik Lundqvist preventing four attempted penalty shots from converting. The win enabled Sweden to claim their 10th championship title. Nylander was named tournament Most Valuable Player, with seven goals and seven assists in ten games.

References

External links
 Official website

Final
2017
IIHF World Championship Final
2017 IIHF World Championship Final
2010s in Cologne
Canada men's national ice hockey team games
Sweden men's national ice hockey team games
Canada–Sweden relations
May 2017 sports events in Germany